Adrian Collier (born 1 November 1965) is a British sprint canoer who competed in the late 1980s. He was eliminated in the repechages of the K-4 1000 m event at the 1988 Summer Olympics in Seoul.

References
Sports-reference.com profile

1965 births
Canoeists at the 1988 Summer Olympics
Living people
Olympic canoeists of Great Britain
British male canoeists